A  is a first-level administrative division of many Arab countries, and a second-level administrative division in Saudi Arabia. The term is usually translated as "governorate", and occasionally as "province". It comes from the Arabic root   (verb: حافظ ḥafaẓa), which means to "keep" and "guard".

Muhafazat in Arab countries
Governorates of Bahrain
Governorates of Egypt
Governorates of Iraq
Governorates of Jordan
Governorates of Kuwait
Governorates of Libya (historic)
Governorates of Lebanon
Governorates of Oman
Governorates of Palestine
Governorates of Saudi Arabia (2nd level)
Governorates of Syria
Governorates of Yemen

The governorates of Tunisia are wilāyah in Arabic.

Types of administrative division